Acanthoceramoporella is an extinct genus of cystoporate bryozoans from the Ordovician period.

References 

Cystoporida
Prehistoric bryozoan genera